National Hajj Council (also National Hajj Committee or Ghana Hajj Secretariat or Ghana Hajj Board) is a division under the Pilgrims Affairs Office of Ghana's Ministry of Foreign Affairs. It was set up to oversee the annual airlifting of Ghanaian Hajj pilgrims to Saudi Arabia.

Cost of Hajj
Cost of Hajj per head experience frequent fluctuations, falling in some years and rising in others mainly due to instability of the Ghanaian cedi.  When pegged against the US dollar however the unit cost has remained fairly steady in the last 5 years.

Leadership

Leadership of the National Hajj Council is appointed by President of Ghana in consultation with the Chief Imam of Ghana. Over the years different government administrations have reorganized leadership structure of the Hajj facilitation body under various names.

2017 reconstitution

Akuffo-Addo government in 2017 reconstituted the erstwhile Hajj Committee into three major units supervised by an eleven-member board. The three units are Medical, Communications and an Information Technology directorate; the latter tasked with the responsibility to build and deploy a technology infrastructure to manage all Hajj operations.

Chronology of leaders

Notes
1. The following persons support leadership of the 2017 Hajj team: Sadique (PhD) - Adviser to Board chairman, and Gariba Malik - Passport issues.

References

Government of Ghana